Lukáš Budínský (born 27 March 1992) is a Czech footballer currently playing for Karviná on loan from FC Baník Ostrava. He plays as a midfielder.

Club career
Lukáš Budínský made his way into the Bohemians 1905 first team in 2011 and made his league debut against Teplice on 21 May 2011.

Career statistics

International

References

External links

1992 births
Living people
Czech footballers
Czech Republic international footballers
Czech First League players
Czech National Football League players
Bohemians 1905 players
MFK Karviná players
FK Mladá Boleslav players
FC Baník Ostrava players

Association football midfielders
Footballers from Prague